The Tea Road may refer to:

The Tea Horse Road starting in Yunnan province, China, and leading into Burma and Tibet
The Siberian Route over which large quantities of tea were transported from China to Europe